The Postal Museum of Egypt is located at Al-Ataba Square, second floor of the Central Post Office building, Central Cairo spread over 543 sq. meters. The museum was established in February 1934 but it was not open to the public until January 1940. The postal museum has displays of postal artifacts, pictures and documents showing different ways of delivering messages in Egypt over the centuries.

Visitors can see Egyptian postage stamps issued by the Egyptian postal authority over the previous one hundred and fifty years, postal employee uniforms, postal equipment, models of post offices, miniature figurines of postal services over the centuries and a historical section.

References 

Postal museums
Museums in Cairo